Quemusia is a genus of Australian intertidal spiders first described by V. T. Davies in 1998.

Species
 it contains four species:
Quemusia aquilonia Davies, 1998 – Australia (Queensland)
Quemusia austrina Davies, 1998 – Australia (Queensland)
Quemusia cordillera Davies, 1998 – Australia (New South Wales)
Quemusia raveni Davies, 1998 – Australia (Queensland)

References

Araneomorphae genera
Desidae
Spiders of Australia